Vachon Bakery is a Canadian maker of popular snack pastries. Vachon was owned by Saputo Inc. between 1999 and 2015, and has been owned by Canada Bread since 2015.

Vachon was founded by Joseph-Arcade and Rose-Anna Vachon Giroux in 1923 when the couple left his home village of Saint-Patrice-de-Beaurivage to develop a bakery in Sainte-Marie-de-Beauce in  Quebec.

Brands include:
May West
Jos. Louis
 Billot Log Jelly Rolls
Passion Flakie
Ah Caramel!
½ Lune Moon
Hostess (Canada only) - including Twinkies
Takis (Canada only)

References

External links
Vachon official website

Companies based in Quebec
Bakeries of Canada